Léger-Félicité Sonthonax (7 March 1763 – 23 July 1813) was a French abolitionist and Jacobin before joining the Girondist party, which emerged in 1791. During the French Revolution, he controlled 7,000 French troops in Saint-Domingue during part of the Haitian Revolution. His official title was Civil Commissioner. From September 1792, he and Polverel became the de facto rulers of Saint-Domingue's non-slave population. Because they were associated with Brissot’s party, they were put in accusation by the convention on July 16, 1793, but a ship to bring them back in France didn’t arrive in the colony until June 1794, and they arrived in France in the time of the downfall of Robespierre. They had a fair trial in 1795 and were acquitted of the charges the white colonists brought against them. Sonthonax believed that Saint-Domingue's whites were royalists or separatists, so he attacked the military power of the white settlers and by doing so alienated the colonial settlers from their government. Many gens de couleur (mixed-race residents of the colony) asserted that they could form the military backbone of Saint-Domingue if they were given rights, but Sonthonax rejected this view as outdated in the wake of the August 1791 slave uprising. He believed that Saint-Domingue would need ex-slave soldiers among the ranks of the colonial army if it was to survive. On August 1793, he proclaimed freedom for all slaves in the north province. His critics allege that he was forced into ending slavery in order to maintain his own power.

Early life
Born in Oyonnax, France on March 7, 1763, the son of a prosperous merchant, Sonthonax was a lawyer in the Parlement of Paris who rose in the ranks during the French Revolution. Sonthonax's wealth was due to his father's business, which employed many people from the region, and had made his father the richest man of the village. Sonthonax finished his studies at the University of Dijon, becoming a well-known lawyer with the help of his wealthy father. A member of the Society of the Friends of the Blacks, he became connected with Jacques Pierre Brissot and subsequently aligned himself with the Girondists.

Mission
In August 1791, a slave rebellion (the Haitian Revolution) broke out in the northern part of Saint-Domingue, the heart of the island's sugar plantation economy. Saint-Domingue was also wracked by conflict between the white colonists and free people of colour (many of whom were of mixed race), and also between those supportive of the French Revolution and those for a re-establishment of the Ancien Régime — or failing that, for Saint-Domingue's independence.

In 1792, Sonthonax, Etienne Polverel and Jean-Antoine Ailhaud were sent to the colony of Saint-Domingue (now Haïti) as part of the Revolutionary Commission. 
They were accompanied by Jean-Jacques d'Esparbes, who had been appointed governor of Saint-Domingue.
He was to replace governor Philibert François Rouxel de Blanchelande.
The expedition included 6,000 soldiers.
The commissioners found that many of the white planters were hostile to the increasingly radical revolutionary movement and were joining the royalist opposition.
They announced that they did not intend to abolish slavery, but had come to ensure that free men had equal rights whatever their color.
D'Esparbes worked against the commissioners and became popular with the royalist planters.
On 21 October 1792, the commissioners dismissed d'Esparbès and named the vicomte de Rochambeau governor general of Saint-Domingue.

Their main goal was to maintain French control of Saint-Domingue and enforce the social equality recently granted to free gens de couleur by the French National Convention as part of the decree of 4 April 1792. The legislation re-established French control of Saint-Domingue, granted full citizenship and political equality to free male blacks and free male mulattoes, but did not emancipate the slaves. Instead, he was tasked to defeat slave rebellions and induce the slaves to return to the plantations. Sonthonax had initially decried the abolition of slavery to gain the support of the whites on the island. Upon his arrival, he found that some whites and free people of color were already cooperating against the slave rebels. He did exile many radical whites who would not accept free coloreds as equals and managed to contain the slave insurgency outside of the North.

Sonthonax and Polverel were sent to Saint-Domingue, as they proclaimed when they arrived, not to abolish slavery but to give to the free men, regardless of the color of their skin, equality of rights, granted to them by the decree of April 4, 1792. But ultimately, all slaves in the north province were granted freedom on August 29, 1793, by Sonthonax, and in the west and south provinces, from August 27 to 31 October, 1793, by Polverel.  Following the proclamation, Sonthonax wrote a reply to those that were opposed to his and Polverel's decision in 1793 to grant these select slaves this new freedom. He declares his never ending belief that civil rights should be granted to these Africans and defends his decision to free the slaves was not erroneous to do. Sonthonax's Proclamation Au nom de la République explained his role in the Revolution. He was committed to make drastic decisions to prevent Britain and Spain from succeeding in their attempts to assume control over Saint-Domingue.

Emancipation and conflict
In February 1793, France declared war on Great Britain, which presented a new problem for Sonthonax. All those he had alienated in trying to uphold the French Revolution in Saint-Domingue proceeded to try and flee to the British West Indies (primarily Jamaica), where the colonial authorities gave shelter to the French counter-revolutionary émigrés. The white population in the colony declined significantly until only 6,000 remained after June 1793.

On 20 June 1793 a failed attempt to take control of the capital by a new military governor sympathetic to whites, François-Thomas Galbaud, led to the bombardment and burning of Cap-Français (now Cap-Haïtien). The burning was likely done by the roughly 1,000 non-native sailors among Galbaud's forces. Sonthonax made General Étienne Laveaux governor and expelled Galbaud from the colony after  a promise of freedom for ex-slaves who agreed to fight on behalf of the commissioners and the French republican regime they represented. Up to this point the commissioners had still been pursuing the fight against the black slaves, whose insurrection had begun in August 1791. Their emancipation was a momentous victory for all slave forces, and oral histories suggest a boost in their morale.  On June 24, 1793, 60% of the white population left Saint-Domingue with Galbaud, most never to return.

On August 29, 1793, with rumors of emancipation rampant, Sonthonax took the radical step of proclaiming the freedom of the slaves in the north province (with severe limits on their freedom). 
From August 27 to 31 October, 1793, on his side, Polverel progressively emancipated the slaves in the west and south provinces.

It was during this time, and due to the new trend of conceding rights to blacks, that Toussaint Louverture began reforming his political philosophy to embrace France rather than Spain; however, he was cautious and awaited French ratification of emancipation before officially changing sides. 
On February 4, 1794, the French National Convention ratified this act, applying it to all French colonies, including Guadeloupe.
 
Due to the fact that they were under a decree of accusation, on that day, Sonthonax and Polverel’s names were not pronounced in the convention, not even by Dufay, the deputy of Saint-Domingue sent by Sonthonax to explain to the deputies of the convention why slavery had been abolished in the colony.

Emancipation was one of the most momentous events in the history of the Americas.

The enslaved population of Saint-Domingue did not flock to Sonthonax's side as he had anticipated, while white planters continued to resist him. They were joined by many of the free men of color who opposed the abolition of slavery in the colony, many of them being planters themselves. It was not until word of the ratification of emancipation by the French government arrived back in the colony that Toussaint Louverture and his corps of well-disciplined, battle-hardened former slaves came over to the French Republican side in early May 1794.

A change in the political winds back home caused Sonthonax to be recalled to France to defend his actions. When he returned in the summer of 1794, he argued that the free people of colour, whom he had been originally sent to defend, were no longer loyal to France, and that the Republic should place its faith in the freed slaves. Vindicated, Sonthonax returned to Saint-Domingue a second time. The Comte d'Hédouville was sent by France to be governor of the island, but was eventually forced to flee.

Death and legacy
Toussaint, in the meantime, was consolidating his own position. The black general arranged for Sonthonax to leave Saint-Domingue as one of its elected representatives in 1797, and when Sonthonax showed himself to be hesitant, Toussaint placed him under armed escort onto a ship bound for France on 24 August. He died in his home town 16 years later.

Léger-Félicité Sonthonax is a controversial figure of the Haitian Revolution. His critics (Toussaint, Jean-Jacques Dessalines or André Rigaud) have denounced him as being vain, power-hungry and duplicitous. Thomas Madiou, one of Haïti's most famous historians, writing in the middle of the 19th century deduced that his ultimate goal was to become Governor General of the island, autonomous from France and Napoleon Bonaparte and so General Toussaint exiled him back to France. Toussaint felt that Sonthonax was using their plight to further his own agenda of a power grab. Sonthonax is considered a controversial figure in Haitian history because of his alleged duplicitous nature. Sonthonax is seldom spoken of in Haiti today.

Notes

Sources

External links
 The Louverture Project: Léger Félicité Sonthonax
 Sonthonax, Léger-Félicité. Motion d'ordre prononcée au Conseil des cinq-cents par Sonthonax, député de St. Domingue, sur le sort des colons restés fidèles à la République dans la séance du 12 Germinal, An VI, [s.l. ; s.n.], 1798. 
 Réveillère, Paul-Emile-Marie. Polvérel et Santhonax, Paris, Librairie militaire de L. Baudoin, 1891. 
 Castonnet des Fossés, Henri. La perte d'une colonie : la révolution de Saint-Domingue, Paris, A. Faivre, 1893. 
 Clausson L. J. et Millet, Thomas. Impostures de Sonthonax et Polverel dévoilées à la Convention nationale, [s.l. ; s.n.], 1794.

Further reading
  Koekkoek, René (2020) The Citizenship Experiment Contesting the Limits of Civic Equality and Participation in the Age of Revolutions. Studies in the History of Political Thought

1763 births
1813 deaths
People from Oyonnax
French abolitionists
People of the French Revolution
Governors of Saint-Domingue
People of the Haitian Revolution
People of Saint-Domingue
Members of the Council of Five Hundred